is a Japanese television drama that aired on NHK in 2010–2011. It was the 83rd Asadora. It starred a new actress, Miori Takimoto, in the role of a young woman raised by an adopted family in Onomichi who learns of her real grandmother and decides to move to Osaka to start an okonomiyaki restaurant. The title word "teppan" refers to the metal surface on which okonomiyaki are cooked. The series, while interrupted by the Tohoku earthquake, averaged a 17.2% rating (in the Kanto region), making it the fourth most popular of the Asadora dramas in the previous five years.

Cast
Miori Takimoto, as Akari Murakami, the heroine
Narumi Yasuda, as Michiko Murakami, Akari's adoptive mother
Ken'ichi Endō, as Jō Murakami, Akari's adoptive father
Shingo Yanagisawa
Toshinori Omi
Shūji Kashiwabara
Hidekazu Akai
Rie Tomosaka
Sumiko Fuji, as Hatsune Tanaka, Akari's real grandmother
Tamao Nakamura (narrator)
Haruka Kinami, as Tanaka Chiharu

International broadcast 
  The broadcast rights for the drama were sold to Sri Lanka with the intention of dubbing it into Sinhalese.

References

External links

2010 Japanese television series debuts
2011 Japanese television series endings
Asadora
Television shows set in Osaka